Blaton is a village of Wallonia and a district of the municipality of Bernissart located in the province of Hainaut, Belgium. 

It was formerly a separate municipality until it merged in 1977.

Notable residents
Victor Martin, a Belgian Resistance member and academic sociologist who was sent to report on allegations of mass-murder of Jews in Poland for the resistance in 1943.
Luce Irigaray, a feminist philosopher and linguist who was born in Blaton in 1930.

References

Former municipalities of Hainaut (province)